George Farmhouse is a historic home located near Smyrna, Kent County, Delaware.  It built between about 1915 and 1920, and is a two-story, frame dwelling in the Queen Anne style. Parts of the house date to the 19th century, and the one-story and attic kitchen wing may be the oldest section of the house. It features a three-story, offset hexagonal shaped tower with a tent roof and a wraparound porch.

It was listed on the National Register of Historic Places in 1982.

References

Houses on the National Register of Historic Places in Delaware
Queen Anne architecture in Delaware
Houses completed in 1920
Houses in Kent County, Delaware
National Register of Historic Places in Kent County, Delaware